AS Onze Créateurs de Niaréla or simply Onze Créateurs is a Malian football club. The team is based in the city of Bamako.

Achievements
 Malien Première Division: 0

 Malien Cup: 2
 2014, 2016.

 Super Coupe National du Mali: 1
 2016.

References
 https://web.archive.org/web/20141221083223/http://www.footmali.com/ (Le football au Mali)
 Championnat national : les Blancs passent en tête. l'Essor n°16163 du - 2008-03-27

 
Sport in Bamako